Daren Maxwell Kagasoff (KA-guh-sawf; born September 16, 1987) is an American actor. He is best known for starring as Ricky Underwood on the ABC Family teen drama series The Secret Life of the American Teenager from 2008 to 2013.

Early life
Kagasoff was born in Encino, California to Elise Kagasoff (née Levy) and Barry Kagasoff, a diamond merchant. He is the middle of three children; he has an older brother, Justin, and a younger sister, Natalie. Kagasoff is Jewish.

Kagasoff graduated from Montclair Preparatory High School in 2005 where he played on his school's baseball team. While attending school at San Francisco State University, Kagasoff decided to become an actor.

Career
After deciding to return to Los Angeles, Kagasoff landed the lead role in a local theater production of Suburbia, a play that the eponymous 1996 film was based upon. After studying acting, he began auditioning for television and film roles. During one of his first auditions, he impressed producer Brenda Hampton so much that she hand-picked him to star as Ricky Underwood in the ABC Family series The Secret Life of the American Teenager. The show ran for five  seasons.

It was announced on February 24, 2013 that Kagasoff had been cast as Alex in the Fox pilot Delirium, based on the novel by Lauren Oliver. However, the pilot was not picked up to series.

Kagasoff co-starred as Trevor in the supernatural horror film Ouija, directed by Stiles White and co-written by Juliet Snowden and White. The film was released in October 2014.

In September 2014, Kagasoff joined the cast of the Red Band Society, a comedy-drama series on Fox for the 2014–15 American television season developed by Margaret Nagle. He had a recurring role playing Kara's love interest, Hunter Cole. The series premiered on September 17, 2014 and was canceled after one season.

Filmography

Awards and nominations

References

External links
 
 

1987 births
21st-century American male actors
American male film actors
American male television actors
Jewish American male actors
Living people
Male actors from California
People from Encino, Los Angeles
San Francisco State University alumni
21st-century American Jews
Montclair College Preparatory School alumni